The Invincible Medic (仁者無敵) is a TVB television series, premiered in 1980. Theme song "The Invincible Medic" (仁者無敵) composition and arrangement by Joseph Koo, lyricist by Wong Jim, sung by Jenny Tseng. The martial arts series are likely known for a japanese style of props and culture.

Cast
 Lo Hoi Pang
 Bill Chan
 Maggie Li

1980 Hong Kong television series debuts
1980 Hong Kong television series endings
1980s Hong Kong television series
TVB dramas
Cantonese-language television shows